The list of shipwrecks in April 1841 includes ships sunk, foundered, wrecked, grounded, or otherwise lost during April 1841.

1 April

2 April

3 April

6 April

7 April

8 April

9 April

10 April

11 April

12 April

13 April

15 April

16 April

17 April

18 April

19 April

20 April

21 April

23 April

24 April

25 April

26 April

29 April

30 April

Unknown date

References

1841-04